Memphis Murphy known as Memphy (born in 2000 in Harlem, NY) is a New York-based DJ and model.

Work 
Memphy has DJ'd for Madonna's Pride party at Terminal 5, FIST at The Knockdown Center's Basement, Maison Margiela x Gentle Monster, Calvin Klein and SYKY at UnderPUBLIC at the Public Hotel, Intima at the Market Hotel, Bossa Nova Civic Club, amongst others. Memphy was a member of the DJ collective New World Dysorder.

She has modeled for Savage x Fenty, Hood by Air, Dion Lee, and Mugler.

Honey Dijon named Memphy as well as the DJs Infiniti and Dangerous Rose as young trans artists “who are making space, unapologetically and fiercely.”

References 

2000 births
Female models from New York (state)
21st-century American women
American female models
Harlem
Nightlife in New York City
Living people